The India cricket team toured New Zealand in November 2022 to play three One Day Internationals (ODIs) and three Twenty20 International (T20I) matches. The ODI series formed part of the inaugural 2020–2023 ICC Cricket World Cup Super League.

Squads

New Zealand Cricket (NZC) also announced that James Neesham would miss the third ODI as he prepared for his wedding, with Henry Nicholls being named as his replacement for the match. Mark Chapman was added to New Zealand's T20I squad before the third T20I as cover for Kane Williamson, who was announced to be unavailable for the match. On 23 November 2022, Shahbaz Ahmed and Kuldeep Sen were confirmed to be unavailable for selection in India's squad for the ODI series.

T20I series

1st T20I

2nd T20I

3rd T20I

ODI series

1st ODI

2nd ODI

3rd ODI

Notes

References

External links
 Series home at ESPNcricinfo

2022 in New Zealand cricket
2022 in Indian cricket
International cricket competitions in 2022–23
Indian cricket tours of New Zealand